This is a list of file signatures, data used to identify or verify the content of a file. Such signatures are also known as magic numbers or Magic Bytes.

Many file formats are not intended to be read as text. If such a file is accidentally viewed as a text file, its contents will be unintelligible. However, sometimes the file signature can be recognizable when interpreted as text. The column ISO 8859-1 shows how the file signature appears when interpreted as text in the common ISO 8859-1 encoding, with unprintable characters represented as the control code abbreviation or symbol, or codepage 1252 character where available, or a box otherwise. In some cases the space character is shown as ␠ for clarity.

See also
 List of file formats
 Magic number (programming)
 Substitute character (for the 1Ah (^Z) "end-of-file" marker used in many signatures)
 file (command)

References

External links
 Gary Kessler's list of file signatures
 Online File Signature Database for Forensic Practitioners, a private compilation free to Law Enforcement
 Man page for compress, uncompress, and zcat on SCO Open Server
 Public Database of File Signatures
 Complete list of magic numbers with sample files
 the original libmagic data files with thousands of entries as used by file (command)